Janq'u Willk'i (Aymara janq'u white, willk'i gap, "white gap", also spelled Jankho Willkhi) is a mountain in the northern part of the Kimsa Cruz mountain range in the Bolivian Andes, about  high. It is situated in the La Paz Department, Loayza Province, Cairoma Municipality. Janq'u Willk'i lies north of the mountains Taruja Umaña and  Achuma. There are two small lakes at the feet of Achuma and Janq'u Willk'i. They are named Allqa Quta ("two-colored lake", Alca Kkota) and Ch'iyar Quta ("black lake", Chiar Kkota).

References 

Mountains of La Paz Department (Bolivia)